Răzvan Bogdan Matiș (born 25 January 2001) is a Romanian professional footballer who plays as a midfielder for Liga II club Gloria Buzău.

Club career
Born in Cluj-Napoca, Matiș is an academy graduate of Farul Constanța, formerly named Viitorul Constanța. In the summer of 2019, aged 18, he was sent on a one-year loan to FC Argeș Pitești, for which he made his debut on 27 August in a 3–0 Liga II away win over Sportul Snagov. On 13 November that year, he scored his first senior goal in a 2–1 away victory over Dunărea Călărași. 

Matiș totalled 21 games and five goals for "the White-Violets" during the season, as they finished as runners-up in the league and earned promotion to the Liga I. His deal was extended and featured in two games in the latter competition, before returning to the second tier on 10 September on loan at Petrolul Ploiești. After only making four appearances, he was recalled to Viitorul Constanța in late December. 

Matiș made his debut for Viitorul on 4 April 2021, replacing Alexi Pitu in the 62nd minute of a 0–1 Liga I loss to Botoșani. For the following campaign, he was sent on loan to Chindia Târgoviște and Concordia Chiajna.

Career statistics

Club

References

External links

Răzvan Matiș at Liga Profesionistă de Fotbal 

2001 births
Living people
Sportspeople from Cluj-Napoca
Romanian footballers
Association football midfielders
Liga I players
Liga II players
FC Viitorul Constanța players
FC Argeș Pitești players
FC Petrolul Ploiești players
FCV Farul Constanța players
AFC Chindia Târgoviște players
CS Concordia Chiajna players
FC Gloria Buzău players
Romania youth international footballers